Mariia Stoliarenko (born 30 April 2004) is a Ukrainian badminton player. She competed at the 2022 BWF World Championships in the women's doubles with her partner, Yelyzaveta Zharka.

Achievements

BWF International Challenge/Series (0 titles, 3 runners-up) 
Women's single

Women's doubles

  BWF International Challenge tournament
  BWF International Series tournament
  BWF Future Series tournament

BWF Junior International (2 titles, 2 runners-up) 
Girls' singles

Girls' doubles

  BWF Junior International Grand Prix tournament
  BWF Junior International Challenge tournament
  BWF Junior International Series tournament
  BWF Junior Future Series tournament

References

External links 
 

Living people
2004 births
Sportspeople from Kharkiv
Ukrainian female badminton players
Badminton players at the 2010 Summer Youth Olympics
Badminton players at the 2015 European Games
Badminton players at the 2019 European Games
European Games competitors for Ukraine
21st-century Ukrainian women